Jeremy Bryan Sowers (born May 17, 1983) is an American former professional baseball pitcher and current executive. He played in Major League Baseball (MLB) for the Cleveland Indians from 2006 to 2009, and is currently the manager of major league operations for the Tampa Bay Rays.

Sowers grew up in Louisville, Kentucky, where he attended Ballard High School. His twin brother, Joshua Sowers, formerly played in the Toronto Blue Jays organization. Sowers' pitching repertoire featured a fastball with which he varied the speed between about 85 and 92 mph, a curveball, a slider that cuts in on right-handed batters, and a changeup.

High school and college
Sowers threw four no-hitters in high school. In both his junior and his senior year at Ballard, he led the team to consecutive appearances in the state high school championship game and was named All-State, All-Section, All-Region and County Player of the Year. As a senior, he was named to Baseball America's National High School All-American team, Kentucky Gatorade Player of the Year, Mr. Kentucky Baseball and Kentucky High School Coaches Association Athlete of the Year. He was selected out of high school with the 20th overall pick in the 2001 Major League Baseball Draft by the Cincinnati Reds.

Rather than sign with the Reds, Sowers chose to attend Vanderbilt University where he was named to the Louisville Slugger Freshman All-American team following the  season and to their  pre-season All-American team. He was second team All-SEC as both a sophomore and a junior and was also selected second team All-South Region by the American Baseball Coaches Association as a sophomore.

In 2002 and 2003, Sowers played collegiate summer baseball for the Wareham Gatemen of the Cape Cod Baseball League (CCBL). A league all-star in 2003, he posted a 1.20 ERA with 64 strikeouts in 67.1 innings. Sowers was inducted into the CCBL Hall of Fame in 2017.

After his junior year at Vanderbilt, the Indians selected Sowers with the 6th overall pick in the 2004 Major League Baseball Draft and he signed with them for a $2.475 million signing bonus, the third highest bonus in club history. During the 2005–06 offseason, he was granted permission by the club to return to Vanderbilt to complete his political science degree.

Minor leagues
Sowers split most of the  season between the Indians' Single-A (Kinston) and Double-A (Akron) farm teams, compiling a combined 13–4 record and 2.40 ERA. He finished 2005 with a single start for the Triple-A Buffalo Bisons in which he was credited with a win. He was named the Indians Minor League Pitcher of the Year (Bob Feller Award) for the 2005 season. Baseball America named him the #2 prospect in the Indians organization, the #6 prospect in the Carolina League and the #8 prospect in the Eastern League.  He was named the Indians' 2005 Minor League Player of the Year (receiving the "Lou Boudreau Award").

In , he was a non-roster invitee at the Indians' spring training, but did not make the club's Opening Day roster, beginning the season with Buffalo. In 15 starts for the Bisons, he picked up where he left off in 2005, posting a sterling 9–1 record and 1.39 ERA. Baseball America named him the #3 prospect in the International League.

Major leagues
Sowers' performance for Buffalo in 2006 earned him a promotion to Cleveland on June 20 where he made his major league debut against the Reds on June 25, taking the loss (5 IP, 4 ERs, 5 Hs, 2 HRs, 3 SOs, 2 BBs). He tossed his first major league complete game shutout on July 22, against the Minnesota Twins, allowing 4 hits and 1 walk while striking out 4. In his next start against Boston, he extended his scoreless inning streak to 22 before yielding an RBI double in the fifth inning.

When Cliff Lee was injured during spring training, Sowers was bumped up to the third spot in the starting rotation. However, he struggled through the first two months of the season (1–6, 6.93 ERA in 12 starts) and was demoted to Buffalo on June 10.

During spring training in 2009, Sowers competed for the fifth starting pitcher slot; he was not selected and was sent down to the Triple-A  Columbus Clippers.

On March 31, 2010, after failing to secure a spot in the major league starting rotation, Sowers was sent outright to Triple-A Columbus and removed from the Indians' 40-man roster. Suffering with a sore shoulder for most of the season, Sowers was finally placed on the disabled list on August 14, 2010 and did not play for the remainder of the 2010 season.

Post playing career
After playing Independent baseball he earned his MBA and worked corporate strategy for Wal-Mart before returning to baseball with the Baltimore Orioles.

He served as an assistant in the Tampa Bay Rays baseball operation department. In February 2020, when James Click left the Rays to become the general manager of the Houston Astros, Sowers was promoted to manager of major league operations.

Sowers and his wife, Ashley, have two daughters.

References

External links

1983 births
Living people
Cleveland Indians players
Major League Baseball pitchers
Baseball players from Ohio
Akron Aeros players
Buffalo Bisons (minor league) players
Kinston Indians players
Columbus Clippers players
Wareham Gatemen players
Southern Maryland Blue Crabs players
Ballard High School (Louisville, Kentucky) alumni
Tampa Bay Rays executives
Baseball players from Louisville, Kentucky
People from St. Clairsville, Ohio